Black Tot Day (31 July 1970) was the last day on which the Royal Navy issued sailors with a daily rum ration (the daily tot).

History

17th century
In the 17th century, the daily drink ration for English sailors was a gallon of beer (about four litres), although frequently small beer was used with an alcohol content below 1%. Due to the difficulty in storing the large quantities of liquid that this required, in 1655 a half pint (284 ml) of rum was made equivalent and became preferred to beer. Over time, drunkenness on board naval vessels increasingly became a problem and the ration was formalised in naval regulations by Admiral Edward Vernon in 1740 and ordered to be mixed with water in a 4:1 water to rum ratio and split into two servings per day.

19th century
In the 19th century, there was a change in the attitude towards alcohol due to continued discipline problems in the navy. In 1850, the Admiralty's Grog Committee, convened to look into the problems associated with the rum ration, recommended that it be eliminated completely. This led to the ending of the ration for officers in 1881 and warrant officers in 1918.

20th century
On 17 December 1969 the Admiralty Board issued a written answer to a question from the MP for Woolwich East, Christopher Mayhew, saying "The Admiralty Board concludes that the rum issue is no longer compatible with the high standards of efficiency required now that the individual's tasks in ships are concerned with complex, and often delicate, machinery and systems on the correct functioning of which people's lives may depend". This led to a debate in the House of Commons on the evening of 28 January 1970, now referred to as the 'Great Rum Debate', started by James Wellbeloved, MP for Erith and Crayford, who believed that the ration should not be removed. The debate lasted an hour and 15 minutes and closed at 10:29 p.m. with a decision that the rum ration was no longer appropriate.

31 July 1970 was the final day of the rum ration and it was poured as usual at 6 bells in the forenoon watch (11am) after the pipe of 'up spirits'. Some sailors wore black armbands, tots were 'buried at sea' and in one navy training camp, the Royal Naval Electrical College at Fareham in Hampshire, there was a mock funeral procession complete with black coffin and accompanying drummers and piper. The move was not popular with the ratings despite an extra can of beer being added to the daily rations in compensation.

A special stamp was issued, available from Portsmouth General Post Office, with the slogan "Last Issue of Rum to the Royal Navy 31 July 1970".

Black Tot Day was subsequently followed in two other Commonwealth navies (the Royal Australian Navy having already discontinued the rum ration, in 1921): 
31 March 1972 was the final day of the rum ration in the Royal Canadian Navy. 
28 February 1990 was the final day of the rum ration in the Royal New Zealand Navy.

See also 
 Grog

References

History of the Royal Navy
1970 in the United Kingdom
Alcohol in the United Kingdom